The Golgotha of the Beskids is a Way of the Cross on the Matyska hill in the Radziechowy village, near Żywiec, in the Silesian Beskids of south Poland.

See also
Millennium Cross, in North Macedonia
Soko Grad cross, in Serbia

References

External links
Golgota Beskidów (pl)

Catholic sculpture
Silesian Beskids
Monumental crosses
Polish sculpture
Żywiec County